Haitang is a county-level district under the jurisdiction of the city of Sanya, Hainan province, China. The district was established on 12 February 2014.

Former administrative subdivisions
Haitang has jurisdiction over the former towns of:

References

Sanya
County-level divisions of Hainan